The Daehan Fire Insurance Cup 2000 was the 13th competition of the Korean League Cup, and one of two Korean League Cups held in 2000.

Group stage

Group A

Group B

Knockout stage

Bracket

Semi-finals

Final

Awards

Source:

See also
2000 in South Korean football
2000 Korean League Cup
2000 K League
2000 Korean FA Cup

References

External links

2000 Supplementary
2000 domestic association football cups
2000 in South Korean football